Ooperipatellus spenceri is a species of velvet worm in the family Peripatopsidae. This species has 14 pairs of legs. Although found in Tasmania, Australia, these velvet worms were first assigned to O. insignis, a similar species found in Victoria, Australia, before being named as a separate species. Authorities recognize O. spenceri as a different species, noting the significant distance (652 km) between the type localities of these two species and their separation by the Bass Strait.

References

Onychophorans of Australasia
Onychophoran species
Animals described in 1913